The Castellieri culture developed in Istria during the Mid-Bronze Age, and later expanded into Friuli, Dalmatia and the neighbouring areas. It lasted for more than a millennium, from the 15th century BC until the Roman conquest in the 3rd century BC. It takes its name from the fortified boroughs, Castellieri, which characterized the culture.

The ethnicity of the Castellieri civilization is uncertain, although it was most likely of Pre-Indo-European stock, coming from the sea. The first castellieri were indeed built along the Istrian coasts and present the same Megalithic appearance characterizing in the Mycenaean civilization at the time.

The Castellieri were fortified boroughs, usually located on hills or mountains or, more rarely (such as in Friuli), in plains. They were constituted by one or more concentric series of walls, of rounded or elliptical shape in Istria and Venezia Giulia, or quadrangular in Friuli, within which was the inhabited area.

Some hundred castellieri have been discovered in Istria, Friuli and Venezia Giulia, such as that of Leme, in the central-western Istria, of Elerji, near Muggia, of Monte Giove near Prosecco (Trieste) and San Polo, not far from Monfalcone. However, the largest castelliere was perhaps that of Nesactium, in the southern Istria, not far from Pula.

See also
Monkodonja
Histri
Carni
Liburnians
Adriatic Veneti
Iapydes
Bronze Age Italy
Ancient peoples of Italy

Classical sources
 Livy, Ab Urbe Condita 
 Strabo, Geographica, book 5

Sources
G. Bandelli – E. Montanari Kokelj (a cura di), Carlo Marchesetti e i castellieri, 1903-2003, Atti del Convegno internazionale di Studi (Castello di Duino, 14-15 novembre 2003), Editreg, Trieste 2005.
 Roberto Bosi, L'Italia prima dei Romani, Milano 1989
 Gianna Buti e Giacomo Devoto, Preistoria e storia delle regioni d'Italia, Firenze 1974
 Giacomo Devoto, La civiltà dei castellieri, in Trentino-Alto Adige e Friuli-Venezia Giulia, Ed. De Agostini, Novara 1979
 Ugo Di Martino, Le Civiltà dell'Italia antica, Milano 1984
 Carlo Marchesetti, I castellieri preistorici di Trieste e della regione Giulia, Museo civico di Storia naturale, Trieste 1903.
 Aleksandar Stipčeviċ, Gli Illiri, Milano 1966
 Autori vari, Storia di Roma Vol.I: Roma in Italia, Einaudi, Torino 1988
 Autori vari, Popoli e civiltà dell'Italia antica, Vol. I di Antonio M. Radmilli, Roma 1974
 Autori vari (T.C.I.) Friuli-Venezia Giulia ed. aggiornata, Roma 2005

Bronze Age cultures of Europe
Iron Age cultures of Europe
Archaeological cultures in Croatia
Archaeological cultures in Italy
Archaeological cultures in Slovenia